Mạc Kính Chỉ (莫敬止, ?–1593) was the seventh emperor of the Mạc dynasty. He reigned briefly from 1592–1593. 

He was the eldest son of Mạc Kính Điển. The emperor Mạc Mậu Hợp was captured by Trịnh lord in 1592, so he enthroned in Thanh Lâm. He led sixteen to seventeen thousand men, later, Mạc Toàn abdicated and surrendered to him.

In the next year, Chỉ was captured by two generals of Trịnh lord, Hoàng Đình Ái and Nguyễn Hữu Liêu, and executed in Thang Long.

References

1593 deaths
Mạc dynasty emperors
Year of birth unknown
Vietnamese monarchs